The Italian general election of 1996 took place on 21 April 1996.

Results

Chamber of Deputies

Source: Ministry of the Interior

Senate

Source: Ministry of the Interior

Elections in Aosta Valley
1996 elections in Italy
April 1996 events in Europe